Celaleddin Koçak (born 24 November 1977 in West Berlin, West Germany) is a Turkish footballer.

He began his career at Tennis Borussia Berlin but found little success there. Like many young footballers born to Turkish immigrant parents in Germany, he tried his chances by joining a Turkish team. In December 1999, he decided to join Altay S.K. of İzmir. Six months later he had been impressive enough to earn a place at Süper Lig side MKE Ankaragücü. He stayed there for two years, joining Diyarbakırspor in 2002. Here he helped the newly promoted side to remain in the top division.

In summer 2003, Koçak joined Malatyaspor and it was here that he really made a name for himself. As well as helping Malatyaspor to a mid table place, he was particularly impressive in their performances in the UEFA Cup.

The next year, he joined Ziya Doğan, who had brought him to Malatyaspor a year earlier, at Trabzonspor. Again, he established himself in the team from the beginning and became a regular as Trabzonspor finished as runners up in the league.

Koçak in a left sided player who can alternate between defence and midfield. At Trabzonspor, he was used primarily in defence. His abilities lie in his power and speed which help him to make forward runs as well as defending effectively.

References

External links 
 Profile at TFF.org
 

1977 births
Living people
Footballers from Berlin
Turkish footballers
Turkey under-21 international footballers
Association football defenders
2. Bundesliga players
Süper Lig players
Tennis Borussia Berlin players
Altay S.K. footballers
MKE Ankaragücü footballers
Diyarbakırspor footballers
Malatyaspor footballers
Trabzonspor footballers
Konyaspor footballers
German people of Turkish descent
Turkey B international footballers